Skogsøy is an island in Lindesnes municipality in Agder county, Norway. There is one bridge, Skogsøysundbrua, which connects the island to the mainland.

The island has a long history, ranging hundreds of years back in time. The name "Skogsøy" could be directly translated to "forest island". Even though there is a considerable amount of forest on the island, it has nothing to do with the name.

Skogsøy is the original site of the company Skogsøy Båtbyggeri, a boat building company. Skogsøy Båtbyggeri was purchased by Båtservice Gruppen in 2006, and all boat production was moved off Skogsøy to other locations.

See also
List of islands of Norway

References

Islands of Agder
Lindesnes